Paraguay competed at the 2017 World Aquatics Championships in Budapest, Hungary from 14 July to 30 July.

Swimming

Paraguayan swimmers have achieved qualifying standards in the following events (up to a maximum of 2 swimmers in each event at the A-standard entry time, and 1 at the B-standard):

Men

Women

References

Nations at the 2017 World Aquatics Championships
Paraguay at the World Aquatics Championships
2017 in Paraguayan sport